In enzymology, a [acetyl-CoA carboxylase] kinase is an enzyme that catalyzes the chemical reaction

ATP + [acetyl-CoA carboxylase]  ADP + [acetyl-CoA carboxylase] phosphate

Thus, the two substrates of this enzyme are ATP and acetyl-CoA carboxylase, whereas its two products are ADP and acetyl-CoA carboxylase phosphate.

This enzyme belongs to the family of transferases, specifically those transferring a phosphate group to the sidechain oxygen atom of serine or threonine residues in proteins (protein-serine/threonine kinases). The systematic name of this enzyme class is ATP:[acetyl-CoA carboxylase] phosphotransferase. Other names in common use include acetyl coenzyme A carboxylase kinase (phosphorylating), acetyl-CoA carboxylase bound kinase, acetyl-CoA carboxylase kinase, acetyl-CoA carboxylase kinase (cAMP-independent), acetyl-CoA carboxylase kinase 2, acetyl-CoA carboxylase kinase-2, acetyl-CoA carboxylase kinase-3 (AMP-activated), acetyl-coenzyme A carboxylase kinase, ACK2, ACK3, AMPK, I-peptide kinase, and STK5.

References

 
 
 
 
 

EC 2.7.11
Enzymes of unknown structure